Curse of Chucky is a 2013 American horror film and the sixth installment of the Child's Play franchise. The film was written and directed by Don Mancini, who created the franchise and wrote the first six films. It stars Fiona Dourif, Danielle Bisutti, Brennan Elliott, Maitland McConnell, Chantal Quesnel, Summer H. Howell, A Martinez, and  Brad Dourif. The film grossed $3.8 million in DVD sales.

Curse of Chucky sees a return to the franchise's source material, bringing back the straightforward horror elements found in the first Child's Play film, as well as Chucky's classic appearance. The film, which went into production in September 2012, is the first direct-to-video installment of the series. In the U.S., it premiered via VOD on September 24, 2013, followed by a DVD and Blu-ray Disc release on October 8, 2013. The film was also turned into a scare zone for 2013's annual Halloween Horror Nights at Universal Studios Hollywood. Though Curse of Chucky was made with a direct-to-video release in mind, it was also seen theatrically in several countries, like Brazil. The film was followed by Cult of Chucky in 2017.

Plot

At the isolated home of paraplegic Nica Pierce and her mother Sarah, a Good Guy doll called Chucky mysteriously arrives in the mail. Later that night, Sarah is found dead from a stab wound and her death is ruled as a suicide. 

Nica is visited by her sister Barb, accompanied by her husband Ian, their daughter Alice, live-in nanny Jill, and priest Father Frank. Alice finds Chucky and is allowed to keep him. That evening, while Alice and Nica are making chili for dinner, Chucky secretly pours rat poison into one of the dinner bowls. Father Frank eats the poison. After he leaves, he gets sick and ends up in a car accident that decapitates him. Back at the house, a storm starts and hinders phone signals, making outside communication difficult. Nica and the others sit and watch projected film, in which Charles Lee Ray can be seen in the background. Nica asks Barb about who the mysterious man is, but Barb has no information. Nica begins investigating where the doll came from.

Jill searches for a missing Chucky, at Alice’s request. As she searches, it is revealed that Jill and Barb have been having an affair. Chucky, having moved himself to the couch next to Ian, recites “life is short” to he and Nica before they return the doll to Alice. At Alice’s bedtime, she reveals to her mother that Chucky has been talking to her, specifically about death. Alice later hides under the blanket with Chucky, where she expresses to him that she is afraid to which he laughs at and replies “you fucking should be”. While Nica searches the internet, she finds news articles about the murders tied to both the doll and Charles Lee Ray. 
As she digs deeper, Chucky sneaks away from a sleeping Alice and electrocutes Jill by kicking a leak water bucket onto an outlet, causing a blackout. Barb tells Ian that she is going to check on Alice, and Ian insinuates that he is aware of her affair with Jill. They fight and Barb storms off. Searching for Alice, Barb is confronted by Nica who is now aware of what Chucky is, but is unable to get a word in edgewise as Barb accuses her of being in league with Ian to expose her affair and take half of her assets. 

Barb goes to the attic clutching Chucky and finds Sarah's large collection of paintings of the same flower. She finds a knife inside Chucky's shirt and peels some of Chucky's now-loose plastic skin, revealing the stitches created by his ex-girlfriend Tiffany hidden underneath. Chucky springs to life and stabs Barb through the eye, killing her. Nica hears Barb's scream and, having crawled up the stairs to warn everyone, attempts to make it to Barb, only to have Barb’s disembodied eyeball thrown at her, followed by Barb’s dead body. Chucky proceeds to torment Nica who finds Jill’s body in her search for help. Nica wakes Ian up in a panic, alerting him of the deaths that have taken place, and they begin a search for Alice. Nica is left in the garage, once more warning Ian about Chucky before he continues searching for his daughter.

Chucky sneaks into the garage and starts the car, filling the garage with carbon monoxide which begins to choke Nica. She breaks the window with an axe to stop Chucky, but he swallows the keys and assumes a lifeless position as Ian rushes into the room. Ian disarms Nica, believing her to be responsible for the murders. As she falls faint due to a medical episode, she asks Ian to administer her medicine, but he refuses. Instead, restraining Nica until she comes back to, further accusing her of malfeasance.

Nica tries to explain that Chucky is alive, but Ian decides to review the footage from the nanny cam that he planted on Chucky earlier (to get evidence of Barb's sexual affair with Jill) and learns that Alice is locked in a closet and that Chucky truly is alive. Exposed, Chucky kills Ian by chopping off his lower jaw with a hatchet. Nica manages to break out of her restraints and avoids the hatchet by blocking it with her legs. The axe gets stuck, allows Nica to grab it and behead Chucky. As Nica wraps her wounded leg, Chucky reattaches his head and pushes Nica off the balcony onto the ground floor.

Nica lays unable to move and asks Chucky why he is murdering her family. He explains through flashbacks that as Charles Lee Ray, he was a friend of her family and obsessed with Sarah. Ray killed Nica's father and kidnapped Sarah while she was pregnant with Nica. While Sarah was captive, Charles brought dozens of flowers to her—the same sort of flowers that Sarah compulsively painted. The cops find Ray’s hiding spot and blaming the discovery on Sarah, stabs her in the stomach (resulting in Nica being born paraplegic) and escapes. Ray's escape from the police ultimately led to his death as a human, which is why he came back to Sarah for revenge. Nica, after stalling by taunting him about his inability to kill former target Andy Barclay, manages to retreat into her home elevator, manages to disarm Chucky after he briefly chases her through the house. Nica plunges the knife into Chucky’s back. Chucky remains motionless for a while before springing back to life.

Officer Stanton, the same officer who found Father Frank's body, arrives at the house and sees Barb's body. Nica holds a bloody knife alone in the elevator while Chucky sits motionless in the corner of the room. 

In her court hearing, Nica is found guilty of the murders and remanded to a mental asylum. Chucky is retained by Stanton after being used as an exhibit at her trial. Stanton, having been offered a fee to deliver Chucky to an unknown client, is ambushed and killed by Tiffany, when she springs from his back seat and slits his throat. A callback to her entrance into the franchise. Tiffany, still in Jennifer Tilly's body collects Chucky and goes to a packaging center to ship him off to a new victim. 

Chucky arrives to the new home of Alice, who is now living with her paternal grandmother. She comes home from school to find Chucky waiting for her. He explains to Alice that her grandmother is busy in the basement and suggest that they play a game called “Hide the Soul”. Chucky starts the voodoo chant to transfer his soul into Alice's body, while in the next room, her grandmother suddenly sits up, with a bag over her head. As she gasps for air, the screen goes black.

In a post-credits scene, Chucky, still in his doll body, is delivered to Andy, now an adult. When Andy turns his back to answer a phone call from his mother, Chucky cuts his way out of the package with a knife. Chucky looks around the house, only for Andy to point a shotgun at Chucky's head and say, "Play with this.", while Chucky responds in an alarmed voice, "Andy!" as Andy shoots Chucky in the head, and, at the same time, the screen fades to black.

Cast

Live action
 Fiona Dourif as Nica Pierce
 Brad Dourif as Charles Lee Ray/Chucky
 Debbie Lee Carrington as Chucky (in-suit performer)
 Danielle Bisutti as Barb Pierce
 Brennan Elliott as Ian
 Maitland McConnell as Jill
 Chantal Quesnel as Sarah Pierce
 Summer H. Howell as Alice Pierce
 A Martinez as Father Frank
 Jennifer Tilly as Tiffany Valentine
 Adam Hurtig as Officer Stanton
 Jordan Gavaris as Ex-Delivery guy
Alex Vincent as Andy Barclay
 Catherine Hicks as Karen Barclay (photograph, during post-credits scene)
 Chris Sarandon as Detective Mike Norris (archive footage)
 Christine Elise as Kyle (photograph, during post-credits scene)

Chucky puppeteers
 Tony Gardner
 Peter Chevako
 Lilo Tauvao
 William Terezakis
 Christopher Sigurdson

Production
In an August 2008 interview, Don Mancini and David Kirschner spoke of a planned reboot of the Chucky franchise, to be written and directed by Mancini. They described their choice of a remake over a sequel as a response to the will of the fans, who "want to see a scary Chucky movie again... to go back to the straightforward horror rather than the horror comedy." They indicated that Brad Dourif would return as the voice of Chucky.

In a subsequent interview, Mancini described the remake as a darker and scarier retelling of the original film, but one that, while having new twists and turns, would not stray too far from the original concept. At a 2009 horror convention, Dourif confirmed his role in the remake. At a reunion panel at the Mad Monster Party horror and sci-fi convention, the cast and crew from the original film confirmed that both a remake and a spin-off are in development. Writer Don Mancini and producer David Kirschner worked on a sequel then titled Revenge of Chucky.

A sequel entered the production in 2012, entitled Curse of Chucky, and was intended for a direct-to-video release.

Filming
The film began production in early September 2012 in Winnipeg, Manitoba, Canada, and ended in mid-October.

Release
Curse of Chucky had its world premiere on August 2, 2013, at the Fantasia Festival, in Montreal, and its European premiere at the London FrightFest Film Festival on August 22, accompanied by screenings of the original trilogy of Child's Play films. The DVD/Blu-ray was released on October 8, 2013, and domestically grossed $3,821,602 in the first month.

Reception
On Rotten Tomatoes, 76% of 21 critics have given the film a positive review, with an average rating of 6.2/10. The site's critics consensus states: "The franchise hex of disappointing sequels is broken by going back to basics in this chilling entry, restoring a sense of playfulness to the Chucky saga." According to Metacritic, the film received "mixed or average reviews" based on an average score of 58 out of 100 from 5 critics.

An early review posted on Bloody Disgusting on August 2, 2013, was very favorable of the film. In it, Brad Miska stated, "Curse of Chucky may just be the best home video sequel since Wrong Turn 2. It's alarmingly good, which puts pressure on Universal to answer as to why they didn't let Mancini shoot this for theaters." He continued to say, "Chucky fans should rejoice... Curse of Chucky is clearly going to re-ignite the franchise for years to come." Ryan Larson of Shock Till You Drop also wrote a mostly positive review, saying, "the movie does so much right that it's easy to overlook the very few flaws it has. The pacing and writing coincide to create a fun blood-soaked jaunt that never gets boring or dull." He goes on to praise the director, pointing out that "Mancini (pulling double duty as writer as well as director) does a great job at introducing and ushering off characters in a fashion that doesn't bog the film down with a bunch of characters who get three minutes of film time before getting the axe, or butcher knife in this case. The kills are kitschy, but in the best way possible, waxing nostalgic of the slasher films of the late eighties and early nineties."

In Brazil, Chucky inspired two episodes of the "Hidden Camera" (Câmeras Escondidas) show broadcast by the local SBT channel.

Accolades
At the film's world premiere at the Montreal Fantasia Festival, it received a Gold Award for Best International Feature.

The film also received a nomination for Best DVD or Blu-ray Release at the 40th Saturn Awards.

Sequels
The film was followed by Cult of Chucky in 2017, a remake of the first film and the TV series Chucky in 2021.

References

External links
 
 
 

2013 films
2013 direct-to-video films
2013 horror films
2013 LGBT-related films
American LGBT-related films
American sequel films
Adultery in films
Child's Play (franchise) films
Direct-to-video horror films
Direct-to-video sequel films
Films about dysfunctional families
Films about paraplegics or quadriplegics
Films set in 2013
Films set in 1988
Films set in Rhode Island
Films shot in Winnipeg
American films about revenge
American slasher films
LGBT-related horror films
Universal Pictures direct-to-video films
Films directed by Don Mancini
2010s slasher films
2010s English-language films
2010s American films
American supernatural horror films
Films about Voodoo
Lesbian-related films
Female bisexuality in film
Films about adultery in the United States